PC Building Simulator 2 is a simulation-strategy video game developed by Spiral House and published by Epic Games Publishing. It is the sequel to PC Building Simulator. The game was released on October 12, 2022 for Microsoft Windows. It features parts based on real life components from a vast array of specialised brands that endorsed the game such as, AMD, Intel, and Nvidia.

Gameplay 
Like the first game, the game is concentrated around owning and running a workshop which builds and maintains PCs, mainly gaming-oriented ones. The sequel expands on the original game by adding new features to the two main game modes: Career, and Free Build. PC Building Simulator 2 will allow new and improved feature such as players to install apps without restarting the PC they are working on, and more in-depth PC customisation. Most of the applications that appeared on the previous game are refreshed and the general visual athletics of the game updated.

In the career mode, the player has moved to Uncle Tim's PC Shop in UK after a fire. Similar to the previous game, the player will start with some beginning jobs, including performing a virus scan for the first customer, and as they progress through the game new tools and more advanced jobs will be available for them.

Development
The trailer of PC Building Simulator 2 was released on 9 March 2022. An open beta for the game was available from 11 June 2022 to 20 June 2022. Epic Games Publishing would publish the game via its own Epic Games Store in October 2022.

Reception

PC Building Simulator 2 received "generally favorable reviews" according to review aggregator Metacritic. NME highlighted the accurate representation of PC building and repairs, but notes that players may lose interest overtime. Dexerto lauded the improvements and new features compared to its predecessor. GameSpew praised the game for setting "a new benchmark for simulation games." Multiplayer.it touted the variety of hardware components and excellent simulation. Impulse Gamer criticised the stock in-game music, but praises the game as a "terrific sim" and great learning tool for aspiring PC builders. Sector.sk praises the game as a well-rounded sequel, but has gripes with the monotonous and repetitive campaign.

References

External links 
 

2022 video games
Business simulation games
Single-player video games
Windows games
Epic Games games
Video games developed in the United Kingdom
Spiral House games